Depressaria leucocephala is a moth of the family Depressariidae. It is found in Fennoscandia, the Baltic region, Russia, Austria, Switzerland and Italy.

The wingspan is about 20 mm. Adults are on wing from June to September.

The larvae feed on Artemisia vulgaris.

References

External links
Lepiforum.de

Moths described in 1884
Depressaria
Moths of Europe
Taxa named by Samuel Constantinus Snellen van Vollenhoven